The Safed attacks were an incident that took place in Safed soon after the Turkish Ottomans had ousted the Mamluks and taken Levant during the Ottoman–Mamluk War in 1517. At the time the town had roughly 300 Jewish households. The severe blow suffered took place as Mamluks clashed bloodily with the new Ottoman authorities. The view that the riot's impact on the Jews of Safed was severe is contested.<ref>D. Tamar, "On the Jews of Safed in the Days of the Ottoman Conquest" Cathedra 11 (1979), cited Dan Ben Amos, Dov Noy (eds.),Folktales of the Jews, V. 3 (Tales from Arab Lands), Jewish Publication Society 2011 p.61, n.3: Tamar . .challenges David's conclusion concerning the severity of the riots against the Jews, arguing that the support of the Egyptian Jews saved the community of Safed from destruction'.</ref>

Historians link the event to the general conflict taking place in the country between the incoming Ottoman regime and its opponents and note that the Jews suffered maltreatment during the war. Accounts of the attack against the Jews in Safed were recorded by historian Rabbi Elijah Capsali of Candia, (Crete) and Rabbi Joseph Garson, who was living in Damascus at the time. According to these reports, many Jews were killed and left injured. They were compelled to flee the city and their property was plundered. Scholars debate whether or not the event led to a decline in the Jewish population of Safed, but all agree that a few years later, Jews had re-established a significant presence in the city.

The attack may have been initiated by retreating Mamluk soldiers who accused the Jews of treacherously aiding the Turkish invaders, with Arabs from the surrounding villages joining the melee.: "In contrast to the Jews of Jerusalem, who were not adversely affected by the conflict between the Mamluks and the Ottoman Turks in 1516, Safed appears to have suffered considerably. Retreating Mamluks attacked the community, while Arabs in nearby villages exploited the opportunity to do likewise."  Alternatively, the attack occurred during an attempt by local Mamluk sheikhs to reassert their control after being removed from power by the incoming Turks. David suggests that the violence may have erupted after rumors of an Ottoman defeat in Egypt led to clashes between supporters of the old regime and those who backed the newly imposed Turkish authority.: "It appears that shortly after the Ottoman conquest in 1517, Safed's Jewish population suffered a severe blow following the dissemination of unfounded reports that the Ottoman sultan had met defeat at the gates of Cairo." Supporters of the deposed Mamluk governor attacked Ottoman officials and after having murdered the Ottoman governor, the mob turned upon the Jews and rampaged through the Jewish quarter, the Jews suffering particular maltreatment.

Many Jews were reportedly killed while others were wounded or had their property pillaged. According to Garson, the Jews were "evicted from their homes, robbed and plundered, and they fled naked to the villages without any provisions."  Many subsequently fled the city, but the community was soon rehabilitated with the financial help of Egyptian Jewry.

The Jewish community quickly recovered. The many Jews who had fled and sought refuge in neighbouring villages returned, and within 8 years the community had reestablished itself, exceeding the former level of 300 households. The Ottoman overthrow of the Mamluks brought about important changes. Under the earlier dynasty, Egyptian Jews were guided by their Nagid, a rabbi also exercising the functions of a prince-judge. This office was abolished because it represented a potential conflict with the jurisdiction of the hahambaşi  or chief rabbi in Istanbul, who represented all Jews in the empire, and who had, via a Jewish officer (kahya), direct access to the sultan and his cabinet, and could raise complaints of injustices visited upon Jewish communities by governors in the provinces or Christians.

See also
1517 Hebron attacks
1834 looting of Safed
1838 Druze attack on Safed

References

Bibliography

 
 

Further reading
David, Abraham. Further data on the pogrom of 1517 against the Jews of Safed, Cathedra 8 (June 1977), p. 190-94. (Hebrew)
Tamar, David. On the Jews of Safed in the Days of the Ottoman Conquest, Cathedra'' 11 (1979), p. 181-82. (Hebrew)

History of Safed
Safed
Jews and Judaism in the Mamluk Sultanate
Safed
1517 riots
Safed attacks